Best Day Ever is the fifth mixtape by American rapper Mac Miller. It was released by Rostrum Records on March 11, 2011, as the follow-up to Miller's acclaimed mixtape K.I.D.S. (2010). The mixtape consists of sixteen songs produced by nine producers (predominantly ID Labs), and includes features from rappers Wiz Khalifa and Phonte.

Four songs from Best Day Ever have music videos: "Donald Trump", "Get Up", "Wear My Hat" and "Best Day Ever".

Release and promotion
Over 20,000 viewers joined Miller for a live video stream prior to the mixtape's release. As of March 2019, the mixtape has received over 1.2 million downloads and 1.5 million streams on its official host, DatPiff. The song "Donald Trump" was released as a single on May 17, 2011. It became his first singles entry on the US Billboard Hot 100, peaking at number 75, and was certified platinum by the Recording Industry Association of America (RIAA). Its music video has received over 180 million views on YouTube, and is Miller's most-viewed video. When the video surpassed 16 million views, Donald Trump acknowledged the song on the social networking site Twitter, stating "Who wouldn't be flattered?".

In June 2016, Best Day Ever was remastered and commercially released by Rostrum Records for its fifth anniversary.

Critical reception

The mixtape received favorable reviews, including an "XL" (second highest) from XXL magazine.

Commercial performance
Following Miller's death on September 7, 2018, Best Day Ever debuted at number 26 on the US Billboard 200 with 17,000 album-equivalent units.

Track listing
Credits adapted from DatPiff and Spotify.

Notes
 signifies an additional producer

Charts

References 

Mac Miller albums
2011 mixtape albums
Albums produced by Sap (producer)
Rostrum Records albums